Ammende Villa is a mansion house and a cultural heritage monument located in Pärnu, Estonia. It is one of the most impressive early examples of Art Nouveau architecture in the country. It now serves as a luxury hotel in the health resort area of Pärnu.

History
The Ammende Villa, with a large garden and adjacent forest, was built in 1904 by local magnate merchant Hermann Leopold Ammende through St. Petersburg's architecture offices Mieritz & Gerasimov in commissioning for the wedding of his daughter. Since its creation, the mansion has served many purposes as a summer casino and club, health establishment, library, and also as a dental clinic during Soviet times, before being restored and converted in 1999 into a hotel by two Estonian businessmen. With spacious halls, salons and rooms furnished in authentic period style, the hotel is located close to the beach and a short-distance walk from the old town.

See also
List of hotels: Estonia

References

External links

Houses completed in 1905
1905 establishments in the Russian Empire
Hotels established in 1999
1999 establishments in Estonia
Buildings and structures in Pärnu
Hotels in Estonia
Art Nouveau architecture in Estonia
Art Nouveau houses
Art Nouveau hotels
Houses completed in 1904
Manor houses in Estonia
Tourist attractions in Pärnu County